The AC 37 was a French anti-tank gun of 37mm caliber, developed by the Ateliers de Puteaux.  It was principally used in the ouvrages and casemates of the Maginot Line in the late 1930s.  It was frequently paired with a Jumelage de Mitrailleuses (JM) cupola with twin machine guns.

The AC 37 was superseded by the AC 47 anti-tank gun.

Characteristics 
 Length of tube : 1.97 m (6.46 ft)
 Rifling: 16, right-handed
 Penetration at 1000m : 30 to 40 mm

References

World War II weapons of France
World War II anti-tank guns
37 mm artillery
Military equipment introduced in the 1930s